The Brest Arsenal (French - arsenal de Brest) is a collection of naval and military buildings located on the banks of the river Penfeld, in Brest, France.

Timeline
1631-1635 Beginning of the foundations of the port infrastructure.
1674 Appearance of the Powder Magazines, Cordellerie and Military Hospital.
1683 Creation of the Troulan dock.
1746 Creation of the three Pontaniou docks near the anchor forges and naval constructions.
1752 Construction of the Bagne demolished in 1947.
1807 Construction of the Bâtiment aux Lions to house the arsenal's magazines.
1822-1827 Construction of Bassin 6 at the Salou.
1858 Appropriation of the Tourville and Jean Bart quays by the navy.
1864-1865 Construction of Bassin 7 at the Salou.
1865 Closure of the Penfeld port to commercial boats, turning it into a military port.
1889-1896 Construction of the South Jetty (1 500 m).
1895-1900 Construction of the West Jetty (200 m).
1899-1902 Transformation of the four Pontaniou docks into 2 large basins, now known as Basin 2 and Basin 3.
1900-1905 South Jetty extended by 750 m.
1905 Construction of the Quai d'Armement.
1910 Installation of the Grande Grue.
1910-1916 Digging of the two construction docks and of the Laninon dry dock, now known as Basin 8 and Basin 9.
1911 Infilling of the terreplein of Brest Castle.
1918 Construction of the Quai des Flottilles.
1931-1933 Closure of the western passage.
1938 Work begun on the construction of Bassin 10 de Laninon (work abandoned 1939-1945).
1940 Construction of the Submarine Base during the German occupation - the military port became an important German strategic base.
1963-1964 Jetty enlarged.
1969-1970 Construction of aircraft-carrier locks 3 and 4.

History

Quays, locks and jetties

Penfeld quays
The Penfeld, within the military enclosure, is almost wholly lined with quays, but ships cannot come directly alongside these quays because of heads of rock that are left exposed at low tide. That's why floating stages are moored fore and aft, mainly on the left bank, to make up postes where some “small” ships can come alongside and use some installations such as the large crane.

Little used upstream of the Pont de Recouvrance, downstream of this bridge these postes nevertheless serve the old sailing ships of the Navy, the tugboats and other support boats of the arsenal, and transrades, passenger ships which provide a service across the roadstead (rade de Brest) between Brest and the Crozon peninsula (Île Longue, École Navale)

Armament quay and oblique quay

External links
 High command of the Brest maritime arrondissement French Navy site

See also
 Île Longue
 Pont de Recouvrance
 Recouvrance
 Penfeld
 Rue Saint-Malo

History of Brest, France
Buildings and structures in Brest, France
Brest
Brest
Arsenals